The 2003 Individual Speedway European Championship

Qualification
Semi-final A:
June 7, 2003
 Lonigo
Semi-final B:
July 19, 2003
 Lviv
Scandinavian Final (semi-final C):
June 6, 2003
 Outrup

Final
August 30, 2003
 Slaný

See also

2003
Euro I